Ernstia quadriradiata is a species of calcareous sponge from Brazil.

References
World Register of Marine Species entry

Ernstia
Animals described in 2001
Fauna of Brazil